Bellecombe-Tarendol is a commune in the Drôme department in southeastern France.

Population

See also 
Communes of the Drôme department

References 

Communes of Drôme